Home is the first major-label album from Angela Aki. The album includes the songs from the singles released over the monthly period. In addition to the normal version of the album, a limited edition was also released. A special song entitled "Rain" from her previous mini album One is also featured. The album has charted at #2 on the Oricon Charts, selling well over 121,000 copies in its first week.

Track listing

Charts
Oricon Sales chart (Japan)

Release history

References 

2006 albums
Angela Aki albums
Japanese-language albums
Sony Music Entertainment Japan albums